Crinum rautanenianum is a species of flowering plant in the family Amaryllidaceae, native to Zambia, Botswana and the Caprivi Strip.

References

rautanenianum
Flora of Zambia
Flora of Botswana
Flora of the Caprivi Strip
Plants described in 1894